Bishop Basil Filevich (January 13, 1918 – April 20, 2006) was a Canadian Ukrainian Greek Catholic hierarch. He served as the second Eparchial Bishop of Ukrainian Catholic Eparchy of Saskatoon from December 5, 1983 until his retirement on November 6, 1995.

Life
Bishop Filevich was born in the family of ethnical Ukrainian Greek-Catholics Omelian and Anna (née Pelakh) Filevich with eight children in Canada. After the school education, he subsequently studied philosophy and theology in the St. Joseph Theological Seminary in Edmonton (1937–1942). Filevich was ordained as a priest on April 17, 1942 after completed theological studies.

After that he had a various pastoral assignments and served as parish priest, chancellor and a Rector of Cathedral of St. Josaphat in Toronto (1951–1978). Five last years before his nomination as bishop, in 1978–1983, he served as a parish priest in Thunder Bay, Ontario.

On December 5, 1983, Fr. Filevich was nominated by Pope John Paul II and on February 27, 1984 consecrated to the Episcopate as the second Eparchial Bishop of Ukrainian Catholic Eparchy of Saskatoon. The principal consecrator was Metropolitan Maxim Hermaniuk.

On November 6, 1995 Bishop Filevich retired and died on April 20, 2006 in the age 88.

Memory
Bishop Filevich Ukrainian Bilingual School is Saskatoon is named after him.

References

1918 births
2006 deaths
People from Smoky Lake County
Canadian bishops
Canadian Eastern Catholics
20th-century Eastern Catholic bishops
21st-century Eastern Catholic bishops
Bishops of the Ukrainian Greek Catholic Church
Canadian members of the Ukrainian Greek Catholic Church
Canadian people of Ukrainian descent
Eastern Catholic bishops in Canada